This is a list of electoral results for the Electoral district of Subiaco in Western Australian state elections.

Members for Subiaco

Election results

Elections in the 1980s

Elections in the 1970s

Elections in the 1960s

Elections in the 1950s

Elections in the 1940s

Elections in the 1930s

Elections in the 1920s 

 Walter Richardson was the sitting member for Subiaco, who changed from the National Labor party to the Nationalists prior to the election.

Elections in the 1910s

Elections in the 1900s

References

Western Australian state electoral results by district